Duchin is a surname. It is the surname of:
Arkadi Duchin (born 1963), Israeli singer-songwriter and musical producer
Eddy Duchin (1909–1951), American pianist and bandleader, father of Peter
Faye Duchin (born 1944), American computer scientist and economist
Moon Duchin, American mathematician
Peter Duchin (born 1937), American pianist and bandleader, son of Eddy